Moorooduc railway station is located on Two Bays Road, Mount Eliza, Victoria, Australia. The station is home to the Mornington Railway Preservation Society. Adjacent to the station is the Mount Eliza Regional Park which incorporates the Moorooduc Quarry Flora and Fauna Reserve.
Moorooduc station has one platform, which terminates services on the line.
Only one track is currently used for services, with the other five are for train maintenance, storage, repairs and locomotives changing ends.

Facilities
Moorooduc station has a heritage signal box obtained from the now defunct Somerton Station (now Roxburgh Park).
Currently, it is not used and is open for free inspection by passengers.

A toilet block was installed in 2013.
A dock is present but is mainly used for renovations and maintenance.
A footbridge from the now closed North Fitzroy Station is also at the station.

Future plans 
The Mornington Railway Preservation Society (operators of Mornington Railway) have worked to restore the old train line that continues over the Moorooduc highway adjacent to the station and into an area that has returned to vegetation. The track runs all the way past Peninsula Link and into Baxter station. A few kilometres down the line is a possible proposed Sumner Road station, but the outcome of the project will vary, especially in terms of money. The railway line will continue and join onto the Stony Point railway line and then terminate at Baxter.

Gallery

References

External links
Mornington Railway Preservation Society
Photograph of Steam Engine K163 and Map
The Heritage Signal Box
The Footbridge
Melway map at street-directory.com.au

Tourist railway stations in Melbourne